Cnephasia amseli is a species of moth of the family Tortricidae. It is found on Sicily and Malta and in North Africa, where it has been recorded from Tunisia.

The wingspan is 16–21 mm. The ground colour of the forewings is white-yellowish with darker strigulation and hazel-brown markings. The base of the wing is suffused and the postbasal fascia and median fascia are hazel-brown. The hindwings are whitish grey, but darker on periphery. Adults have been recorded on wing from April to May.

References

Moths described in 1942
amseli